USS Avocet (AM-19/AVP-4) was a Lapwing-class minesweeper initially acquired by the U.S. Navy for the dangerous task of removing mines from minefields laid in the water to prevent ships from passing.

Avocet was commissioned at the Norfolk Navy Yard, on 17 September 1918, as a minesweeper. Recommissioned on 8 September 1925 as a small seaplane tender, USS Avocet (AVP-4) was present during the Pearl Harbor attack on 7 December 1941. The ship survived the war, and was sold as a hulk on 6 December 1946.

Avocets role in the Attack on Pearl Harbor 
At about 07:45 on Sunday, 7 December 1941, Avocet's security watch reported Japanese planes bombing the seaplane hangars at the south end of Ford Island and sounded general quarters. Her crew promptly brought up ammunition to her guns and the ship opened fire. The first shot from Avocets starboard 3 in (76.2 mm) gun scored a direct hit on a Nakajima B5N2 ("Kate") carrier attack plane that had just scored a torpedo hit on the battleship , moored nearby. The "Kate", from the aircraft carrier 's air group, caught fire, slanted down from the sky, and crashed on the grounds of the naval hospital, one of five such planes lost by Kaga that morning.

Initially firing at torpedo planes, Avocets gunners shifted their fire to dive bombers attacking ships in the drydock area at the start of the forenoon watch. Then, sighting high altitude bombers overhead, they shifted their fire again. Soon afterwards five bombs splashed in a nearby berth, but none exploded.

From her veritable ringside seat, Avocet then witnessed the sortie of the battleship , the only ship of her type to get underway during the attack. Seeing the dreadnought underway, after clearing her berth astern of the burning battleship , dive-bomber pilots from Kaga singled her out for destruction, 21 planes attacking her from all points of the compass. Avocets captain, Lieutenant William C. Jonson, Jr., marveled at the Japanese precision, writing later that he had never seen "a more perfectly executed attack." Avocets gunners added to the barrage to cover the battleship's passage down the harbor.

Although the ship ceased fire at 10:00, much work remained in the wake of the devastating surprise attack. She had expended 144 rounds of 3 in (76.2 mm) and 1,750 of .30 in (7.62 mm) ammunition in the battle against the attacking planes, and had suffered only two casualties: a box of ammunition coming up from the magazines had fallen on the foot of one man, and a piece of flying shrapnel had wounded another. Also during the course of the action, a sailor from the small seaplane tender , unable to return to his own ship, had reported on board for duty, and was immediately assigned a station on a .30 in (7.62 mm) machine gun.

Oil from ruptured battleship fuel tanks had been set afire by fires on those ships, and the wind, from the northeast, was slowly pushing it toward Avocet's berth. Accordingly, the seaplane tender got underway at 10:45, and moored temporarily to the magazine island dock at 11:10, awaiting further orders which were not long in coming. At 11:15, she was ordered to help quell the fires still blazing on board California. She spent 20 minutes fighting fires on board the battleship with the submarine rescue ship , and was then directed to proceed elsewhere.

Leaving California at 12:15, she reached the side of Nevada 25 minutes later, ordered to assist in beaching the battleship and fighting her fires. Mooring to Nevadas port bow at 12:40, Avocet went slowly ahead, pushing her aground at channel buoy no. 19, with fire hoses led out to her forward spaces and her signal bridge. For two hours, Avocet fought Nevadas fires, and succeeded in putting them out.

References

External links 
 NavSource Online: Mine Warfare Vessel Photo Archive – Avocet (AVP 4) – ex-AM-19 – ex-Minesweeper No. 19

World War II seaplane tenders of the United States
Lapwing-class minesweepers
1918 ships
Ships present during the attack on Pearl Harbor
Lapwing-class minesweepers converted to seaplane tenders